Beware of the Trains is a collection of detective short stories by the British writer Edmund Crispin published in 1953. It contains sixteen stories including Beware of the Trains which gave its title to the collection. They all feature Crispin's amateur detective and Oxford professor Gervase Fen, an eccentric with a genius for solving complex cases. A number also featured Detective Inspector Humbleby of Scotland Yard who also appears in two of the novels in the Fen series. Apart from one they had all previously appeared in the Evening Standard newspaper. It was the last work featuring Fen for many years, until Crispin returned to the character for the 1977 novel The Glimpses of the Moon.

Stories

 Beware of the Trains 
 Humbleby Agonistes 
 The Drowning of Edgar Foley 
 Lacrimae Rerum 
 Within the Gates 
 Abhorred Shears
 The Little Room
 Express Delivery
 A Pot of Paint
 The Quick Brown Fox 
 Black for a Funeral 
 The Name on the Window
 The Golden Mean
 Otherwhere
 The Evidence for the Crown
 Deadlock

References

Bibliography
 Reilly, John M. Twentieth Century Crime & Mystery Writers. Springer, 2015.
 Whittle, David. Bruce Montgomery/Edmund Crispin: A Life in Music and Books. Routledge, 2017.

1953 short story collections
Mystery short story collections
Novels by Edmund Crispin
Victor Gollancz Ltd books